Nick Mead may refer to:
 Nick Mead (Royal Navy officer)
 Nick Mead (rower)